The 2016 Rugby Europe Women's Sevens Grand Prix Series was the top level of international women's rugby sevens competitions organised by Rugby Europe during 2016. The series featured two tournaments, one hosted in Kazan and one hosted in Malemort. In preparation for 2016 Summer Olympics, England and Wales were replaced by two Great Britain representative teams, the Lions and the Royals.  France won the Kazan tournament while Russia won the Malemort tournament. Russia won the overall championship. Finland and Ukraine were relegated to the 2017 Trophy series.

Kazan

Pool stages

Pool A

Pool B

Pool C

Knockout stage

Bowl

Plate

Cup

Malemort

Pool stages

Pool A

Pool B

Pool C

Knockout stage

Bowl

Plate

Cup

Final standings

The three highest teams who did not already have core team status during the 2016–17 World Rugby Women's Sevens Series qualified for the 2017 Hong Kong Women's Sevens, which in turn was a qualifying event for promotion to core team status on the 2017–18 World Rugby Women's Sevens Series.

Notes
  The two Great Britain representative teams, the Lions and the Royals were not included in the official ranking.

References

  
2016
Sevens
Sevens
2016 rugby sevens competitions
International women's rugby union competitions hosted by France
International women's rugby union competitions hosted by Russia
2016 in French women's sport
2016 in Russian women's sport
2016 in Russian rugby union
2015–16 in French rugby union
2016–17 in French rugby union